Lepidogma melonolopha is a species of snout moth in the genus Lepidogma. It is known from Sri Lanka and Taiwan.

References

Moths described in 1912
Epipaschiinae